Samuel Scherrer (born 15 March 1997) is a Swiss freestyle wrestler. He is a two-time silver medalist at the European Wrestling Championships.

Career 

In 2020, he won the silver medal in the 92 kg event at the European Wrestling Championships held in Rome, Italy.

In the same year, he also won one of the bronze medals in the men's 92 kg event at the 2020 Individual Wrestling World Cup held in Belgrade, Serbia. In March 2021, he competed at the European Qualification Tournament in Budapest, Hungary hoping to qualify for the 2020 Summer Olympics in Tokyo, Japan. He was eliminated in his first match by Radosław Baran of Poland. A month later, he won the silver medal in the men's 92 kg event at the 2021 European Wrestling Championships held in Warsaw, Poland. In May 2021, he also failed to qualify for the Olympics at the World Olympic Qualification Tournament held in Sofia, Bulgaria.

He competed in the 97kg event at the 2022 World Wrestling Championships held in Belgrade, Serbia.

Achievements

References

External links 
 

Living people
1997 births
Place of birth missing (living people)
Swiss male sport wrestlers
European Wrestling Championships medalists
20th-century Swiss people
21st-century Swiss people